Ethelontides is a monotypic snout moth genus. Its only species, Ethelontides biunicornis, is found on Java in Indonesia. Both the genus and species were first described by Edward Meyrick in 1934.

References

Pyralinae
Monotypic moth genera
Moths of Indonesia
Pyralidae genera
Taxa named by Edward Meyrick